Biodegradable waste includes any organic matter in waste which can be broken down into carbon dioxide, water, methane, compost, humus, and simple organic molecules by micro-organisms and other living things by composting, aerobic digestion, anaerobic digestion or similar processes. It mainly includes kitchen waste (spoiled food, trimmings, inedible parts), ash, soil, dung and other plant matter.  In waste management, it also includes some inorganic materials which can be decomposed by bacteria. Such materials include gypsum and its products such as plasterboard and other simple sulfates which can be decomposed by sulfate reducing bacteria to yield hydrogen sulfide in anaerobic land-fill conditions. 

In domestic waste collection, the scope of biodegradable waste may be narrowed to include only those degradable wastes capable of being handled in the local waste handling facilities.

Biodegradable waste when not handled properly can have an outsized impact on climate change, especially through methane emissions from anaerobic fermentation that produces landfill gas. Other approaches to reducing the impact include reducing the amount of waste produced, such as through reducing food waste.

Sources
Other biodegradable wastes include human waste, manure, sewage, sewage sludge and slaughterhouse waste. In the absence of oxygen, much of this waste will decay to methane by anaerobic digestion.

In the UK, 7.4 million tonnes of biodegradable waste was sent to landfill in 2018 having reduced from 7.8 million tonnes in 2017.

Collection and processing 
In many parts of the developed world, biodegradable waste is separated from the rest of the waste stream, either by separate curb-side collection or by waste sorting after collection. At the point of collection such waste is often referred to as green waste. Removing such waste from the rest of the waste stream substantially reduces waste volumes for disposal and also allows biodegradable waste to be composted.

Biodegradable waste can be used for composting or a resource for heat, electricity and fuel by means of incineration or anaerobic digestion. Swiss Kompogas and the Danish AIKAN process are examples of anaerobic digestion of biodegradable waste. While incineration can recover the most energy, anaerobic digestion plants retain nutrients and make compost for soil amendment and still recover some of the contained energy in the form of biogas. Kompogas produced 27 million Kwh of electricity and biogas in 2009. The oldest of the company's lorries has achieved 1,000,000 kilometers driven with biogas from household waste in the last 15 years.

Climate change impacts

Landfill gas

Food waste

See also

Biodegradability prediction
Biodegradable bags
Biodegradation
Biodrying
Compost
Brown waste
Green waste
Landfarming
Landfill diversion
List of waste types
Miniwaste
Sewage treatment

References

Biodegradable waste management
Biogas substrates
Waste